I16 may refer to:

 Interstate 16, an interstate highway in the U.S. state of Georgia
 Polikarpov I-16, a Soviet fighter aircraft introduced in the 1930s
 Halland Regiment
 , a Japanese Type C submarine
 i16, a name for the 16-bit signed integer, especially in Rust
 VEF I-16, a Latvian fighter prototype built in 1940

See also
 I-16-class submarine